The Stratford Midgets were a Canadian junior ice hockey team that played in the Ontario Hockey Association. The team played at the Stratford Arena, now known as the William Allman Memorial Arena in Stratford, Ontario.

History
The Stratford Midgets trace their roots to the Stratford Hockey Club which existed in the early 1900s. The team featured Hockey Hall of Fame inductee Frank Rankin.

Stratford won the Ontario Hockey Association (OHA) junior championship in three successive seasons in 1907, 1908 and 1909, then won the J. Ross Robertson Cup as OHA junior champions in 1921. The Midgets were the Eastern Canada junior champions in 1921, and finalists at the 1921 Memorial Cup.

Stratford were finalists for the J. Ross Robertson Cup in 1920, 1933, 1934 and 1937. At the end of the 1930s, the team was renamed the Stratford Kist, and subsequently became the Stratford Kroehlers.

National Hockey League alumni
List of Stratford Midgets' alumni who played in the National Hockey League:

References

Defunct Ontario Hockey League teams
Sport in Stratford, Ontario